This is a list of Davidson Wildcats players in the NFL Draft.

Key

Selections

References

Lists of National Football League draftees by college football team

Davidson Wildcats NFL Draft